Alfred Burke Thompson (July 18, 1862 – August 2, 1942) was a barrister and political figure in Ontario, Canada. He represented Simcoe Centre in the Legislative Assembly of Ontario from 1898 to 1902 and from 1905 to 1919 and Simcoe East in the House of Commons of Canada from 1925 to 1935 as a Conservative member.

He was born in Penetanguishene, Canada West, the son of town mayor Alfred Andrew Thompson and the grandson of William Thompson. He was educated at Upper Canada College and Toronto University. Thompson served with the Queen's Own Rifles of Canada during the North-West Rebellion of 1885. In 1889, he married Kate W. May; he married Alberta Marie MacFayden in 1914 after his first wife's death.

References 
 Canadian Parliamentary Guide, 1928, AL Normandin

External links 

1862 births
1942 deaths
Conservative Party of Canada (1867–1942) MPs
Members of the House of Commons of Canada from Ontario
People from Penetanguishene
Progressive Conservative Party of Ontario MPPs
Politicians from Simcoe County